The Ascension (stylized as the_Ascension) is the third studio album by Otep. The original release date was set for March 20, 2007 through Capitol Records, however, the album was delayed indefinitely due to the merger with Virgin Records.

The album debuted at number 81 on the Billboard 200 with 10,200 copies sold.

Recording 
The album was partly recorded in New Orleans, Louisiana, where producer Dave Fortman was living. New Orleans, especially the 9th Ward was still affected by the effects of Hurricane Katrina. Otep said the area and while the songs were not influenced by the area, the mood of the album was.

Several songs were written with Mudvayne guitarist Greg Tribbett, who Fortman had worked with in the past.

Songs

Confrontation 
Otep explained the song to KNAC.com:

"It was about writing a protest anthem to stand up, speak out and strike back. To celebrate the unique opportunity that we have here in America. You can do anything to have your voice be heard in this country, that’s the beauty of this country. There’s no one stopping anyone in America from getting out on the street and saying something or writing a letter or e-mailing and text messaging now that everything is now, now, now."

Otep compared the song to "Warhead" from House Of Secrets.

Breed 
"Breed" is a cover of Nirvana, from their album Nevermind. It is Otep's first cover song. "We'd never done a cover song before but I just love the song. I listen to music before we play on tour and that song just kind of grabbed me. I couldn't get enough of it. I'd listen to it 60, 70 times, just over and over in the back of the bus before the show,” she explained to Campus Circle. “For me, it's just this amazing song that touched me in a certain way that made me miss Nirvana a lot and Kurt Cobain's touch on musical culture and his philosophy on music and art. I just wanted to do something to inspire and to, in a way, connect our energies.”

Reception 
The Ascension received mixed reviews from critics.

Track listing

Personnel
 Otep Shamaya – vocals
 Karma Singh Cheema – guitars
 Holly Knight – mellotron, piano, programming on "Perfectly Flawed"
 Jason "eViL J" McGuire – bass guitar, backup vocals
 Brian Wolff – drums

Production
 Art direction, design – Otep Shamaya, P.R. Brown
 Photography – P.R. Brown, Sam Throne
 Engineer – Jeremy Parker
 Assistant engineers – David Troia, Drew Vonderhaar, Wesley Fontenot
 Executive producer – Jonathan Cohen, Otep Shamaya
 Mastering – Ted Jensen
 Recording, producer, mixing – Dave Fortman
 Drum technician – Rory Facianne
 Co-producer – Holly Knight

References

2007 albums
Otep albums
Capitol Records albums
Albums produced by Dave Fortman